Jism 2 is a 2012 Indian erotic thriller film produced and directed by Pooja Bhatt and written by Mahesh Bhatt. It is the sequel to the 2003 sleeper hit Bipasha Basu starrer Jism and marks the debut of Indo-Canadian actress and former pornographic actress Sunny Leone in Bollywood. Jism 2 was launched on 1 December 2011, on popular Indian television series Bigg Boss, making the launch a first time ever in the history of Indian cinema. Mahesh Bhatt compared Jism 2 to Italian romance drama Last Tango in Paris. Jism 2 has been passed with an A-certificate by the Central Board of Film Certification (CBFC) for strong sexual content. Jism 2 had paid previews on 2 August 2012, one day prior to its worldwide release.

Plot
A woman, Izna (Sunny Leone), is lying on the grass and near death. Before she dies, her voice states that she wants to ask forgiveness for her sins. The film then flashes back to six months.

Izna, a former pornographic actress, is approached by intelligence officer Aayan Thakur (Arunoday Singh). Aaryan and his father Security Chief Guru Saldanah (Arif Zakaria) want to hire Izna as a 'honey trap' and help them retrieve critical information from Kabir Wilson (Randeep Hooda), Izna's ex-boyfriend. Kabir used to work for the Intelligence Agency but went rogue and now operates as a hitman. 

Izna tells Aayan and Guru Saldanah how she met Kabir six years ago; at the time, Kabir still worked for the agency. During one of his missions, he met Izna, who was unknowingly being used to smuggle drugs into a nightclub. That evening, Izna followed him home and handed him a love letter written in her own blood. They started dating until one day Kabir disappeared without telling Izna where he went. Although she desperately tried to find him, she was unable to and resigned herself from ever loving anyone again.

After Izna agrees to the mission, she is taken to a residential colony in Sri Lanka, where Kabir has been living as a musician for the last few months. Izna and Aayan go undercover as an engaged couple, with Aayan pretending to be Karan Rajput, a PR representative. To prepare, Izna is given a book with a detailed backstory on how she and 'Karan' met. Izna is then tasked to go to Kabir's house and introduce herself as his new neighbour. When Kabir sees Izna, he slams the door on her, which upsets her. Kabir tries to approach her the next day but she angrily throws a rock at him. He follows her and writes "Sorry" on her window in his blood but quickly walks away when he gets a phone call. 

Guru Saldanah's team tries to extract the information themselves but are killed by Kabir. Saldanah narrowly escapes. Aayan plans to steal data from Kabir's laptop and asks Izna to distract Kabir. She sends a letter to Kabir telling him that she wants to meet him. After Kabir leaves his house, Aayan breaks in to steal the data. However, when he copies the data from Kabir's laptop, it triggers a silent alarm. After receiving an alert on his phone Kabir hurries back to his house. Aayan narrowly escapes with the data, but he later discovers that it had all been falsified information. After Aayan tells her how many people Kabir has killed, Izna promises she will bring Kabir down.

Kabir's trusted friend Sumit suspects that Izna is involved with the Intelligence Agency and warns Kabir about her. Kabir tells him he has no reason to suspect her. Kabir proposes to Izna and asks her to move in with him and leave 'Karan'. Izna accepts his proposal, thinking it would be beneficial to their mission. Aayan, who has since fallen in love with Izna, gets angry when he finds out. Izna tells him she believes she'll be able to steal the data more easily when she moves into Kabir's house. He agrees and she soon moves into Kabir's house. Kabir asks Sumit to find a priest to conduct the marriage. However, Sumit accidentally reads a text message from Aayan on Izna's phone, proving his suspicions that she's working with the Intelligence Agency. He attacks Aayan and tries to kill him, but instead is killed himself when Aayan shoots him. Aayan meets up with Izna to discuss the mission. He warns her that Kabir might try to kill her when he finds out that Sumit has been murdered and she is involved. Aayan gives her poison and asks her to mix it into Kabir's drink.

When Izna is not at home, Kabir goes to Aayan's house and notices Sumit's hearing aid on the floor inside. Kabir breaks into the house and ends up discovering the book with the story Izna had told him about how she met 'Karan'. He finally believes that Izna is working with the Intelligence Agency and waits for her. When she returns home she offers to make him coffee. However, she blends the poison Aayan had given her into the coffee she serves him. Kabir tells Izna that years ago, he had left Izna becayse he had found out during a sting operation that some of the Intelligence Agency's operatives, as well as some politicians and officers, were corrupt. Not wanting to work for a corrupt organization he had shortlisted them and then killed them. He tells Izna that he's a patriot.

Dumping out the poisoned coffee undrunk, Kabir tells Izna that Guru Saldanah is corrupt and that his team consists of impostors who are after incriminating data, which Kabir keeps stored on a hard disk. He states that Guru Saldanah is running an unsanctioned operation to retrieve the information and will kill Izna once he gets the hard disk. Kabir asks Izna to escape and offers her a new passport, tickets, and access to an account maintained at a Swiss bank from which she can withdraw unlimited money. Izna does not believe him though, and when Kabir kisses her she shoots him in the stomach, after which he dies. Running away with the hard disk containing the original data, she goes to Guru Saldanah and hands over the hard disk. However, she is quickly surprised to discover that Kabir was telling the truth and Guru Saldanah is indeed corrupt. He tells Izna that after the mission, she was supposed to have been killed. Aayan was given this responsibility, but he had changed his mind as he had fallen in love with her. As Guru Saldanah tries to kill Izna himself, Aayan tackles him and kills him instead.

Aayan asks Izna to give him the hard drive and come with him to start a new life together in Europe. Izna declines his offer and tells Aayan that because of his lies she killed the love of her life , an innocent man who blindly trusted her. She tells him that she would rather die with Kabir than spend another day alive with Aayan, and attempts to leave with the hard disk. Aayan threatens to shoot Izna if she doesn't change her mind. After Izna ignores him and leaves the house, Aayan follows her out in the yard and shoots her in the back. After she falls down Aayan approaches her and turns her over. Still alive, Izna who was still holding the gun with which she killed Kabir, shoots Aayan twice in the chest and instantly kills him.

Before dying, Izna sees a vision of Kabir, who tells her he forgives her. She tells him that without him, Heaven is not a heaven, and with him, she has no reason to be afraid of Hell. The film ends as Izna dies.

Cast
 Sunny Leone as Izna, an adult film star turned into a spy. (dubbed using Smita Malhotra's voice)
 Randeep Hooda as Kabir Wilson (Assassin / Patriot)
 Arunoday Singh as Ayaan Thakur (Intelligence Officer) / Karan Rajput (PR Representative of Devi group of Hotels)
 Arif Zakaria as Guru Saldanah (Security Chief Intelligence) / Mr. Thakur, Ayaan's father 
 Sumit Nijhawan as Sumit, Kabir's friend
 Imran Zahid as Imran, a Narcotics Detective and Kabir's assistant

Production

Casting

Producer-director Mahesh Bhatt entered the house of Bigg Boss for a couple of hours to present a contract deal to Sunny Leone to cast her as the lead actress in this sequel of the film Jism. The film would be directed by his producer-actress daughter Pooja Bhatt.

Of casting Leone in the film,  Pooja Bhatt said, "I signed Sunny Leone for the same reason I signed John Abraham in Jism. It was instinct. I broke the perception that models can't act with Jism. Now, I am looking forward to break another perception by signing Sunny Leone, a pornstar in Jism 2." Comparing the two films, Bhatt said that "Jism was a love story for mature audience, Jism 2 is for mature adult audience. We are looking at raising the bar in every sense – emotionally and sensually. It would be the story of human heart, crime of passion, revenge, betrayal, the same elements that made Jism, with a fresh story".

Filming
Filming began on 1 April 2012, in Jaipur. The second schedule of Jism 2 was shot in Goa. The last and final shooting schedule of Jism 2 was in Sri Lanka.
The movie was released in cinemas on 3 August 2012. It was announced the film would be released in two hundred cinemas in Andhra Pradesh, although dubbed in Telugu. Director Bhatt was very fond of Leone's performance as Izna.

Film certification
The CBFC was initially not satisfied with the lengthy sex scenes in Jism 2, and declined to issue a certificate. It objected to several scenes, including the oil massage scene where Izna turns around and a prominent portion of her breast was visible.

Subsequently, the film was granted an A-certificate after Pooja Bhatt made some cuts. She stated that the cuts had not affected the film overall.

Release

Critical reception

Jism 2 received mixed to negative reviews from critics.
Srijana Mitra Das of the Times of India rated the movie 3.5 out 5 and stated, "Jism-2 is a sexy movie – but it's not as dirty a picture as you might expect. Surprisingly, Jism-2 hovers over sex, like a butterfly gliding across one of the many water pools the movie features. Jism-2 offers several surprises, foremost being Leone's performance."

Taran Adarsh of Bollywood Hungama gave the film a score of 2 out of 5, and said, "On the whole, JISM 2 has Sunny Leone as its USP, but the lackluster screenplay and the sluggish pace act as deterrents. However, Sunny Leone in the driver's seat, coupled with a generous dose of skin show and erotica, besides an attention-grabbing title, should act as a honey-trap to lure the audiences. But how one wishes this jism had soul as well!"

Anupama Chopra of the Hindustan Times gave it 2 out 5 noting, "I thought that Jism 2 is a sequel only because it also has sex, might push the envelope again. The film is an anti-climactic let-down.".

Sukanya Verma of Rediff.com gave the film a score of 1.5 out of 5, concluding that "It's like Sunny Leone's assets are the script, screenplay and sole purpose of Jism 2 and everyone outside that – Hooda, Singh, Zakaria or the audience – is obliged to wag their tongues with thrill. Well, duh, for thinking otherwise."

Mayank Shekhar on his website theW14.com writes,"By the time you hit the climax, of the film of course, you realise, there was hardly more sex in it than any other skin flick, and you had to sit through two growling naked guys (Arunoday, Randeep) and a psycho boss (Arif Zakaria) instead, babbling over international terrorism. Audiences are known to giggle at uncomfortable sex scenes."

Rajeev Masand of CNN-IBN awarded it a score of 1 out of 5 while commenting that he thinks "the plot itself is like a big, black hole there is no coming out of. For all its pretentious babble on love and pain, it's a film that leaves your own jism in much pain as you finally get out of your seat."

Independent Bollywood gave 1 out of 5 stars and commented "No Jism in Jism 2".

Protests
The promotion and release of Jism 2 sparked protests by social conservatives across India, including by the National Students Union of India in Allahabad, Bajrang Dal in Bhopal, Assam, Amritsar (where effigies of Leone and Pooja Bhatt were burned) and Mumbai (where protesters tore down posters promoting the film). Some protesters also took legal action against the showing of the film. Rakesh Nayayik, an activist from Varanasi, accused Jism 2 of illegally promoting a porn star, and filed a PIL in the Allahabad High Court to try to get the film banned.

Box office

Domestic
Jism 2 opened well with collections above 90% on average and some places having stronger collections in the 60–70% range in its opening day. Jism 2 performed strongly on its opening day at the box office with collection of around  adding to the  nett paid previews. The film had a huge fall on the second day as it collected around  mainly due to negative critical reception and word of mouth. Jism 2 had a decent first week of  nett including business from paid previews. The film had a steep good in its second weekend collecting around  nett. Boxofficeindia declared the film as "Semi-Hit".

Overseas
Jism 2 took in around $100,000 overseas. It had released on around 60 prints there in four days.

Soundtrack
The soundtrack of Jism 2 is composed by Arko, Mithoon, Abdul Basit Sayeed & Rushk a Pakistani gothic fiction band. The new composers replaced the original composer of Jism, M M Kreem.

Reception
The music of the movie was met with mostly positive reviews. Joginder Tuteja of Bollywood Hungama gave 3 and half out of 5 stars and concluded "Ultimately, Jism 2 delivers a tad more than what seemed like a promise before the album was played. A package affair that goes well with the theme of the film, it also ensures that there is a consistent sound right through the album which doesn't distract a listener or make him jump into the next track". He picked Abhi Abhi, Maula, Yeh Jism as his favourate. Times of India rated it with 4 stars out of five and remarked "The soundtrack has been assembled well and its variety will prove to be its key to success. It also backs the sensuality of the film quite well".

Awards and nominations

References

External links

 
 
 Jism 2 official site 

2012 films
2010s Hindi-language films
Indian erotic romance films
2010s erotic thriller films
Indian erotic thriller films
Films shot in Goa
Films shot in Sri Lanka
Indian sequel films